The 1940 Colgate Red Raiders football team was an American football team that represented Colgate University as an independent during the 1940 college football season. In their 12th season under head coach Andrew Kerr, the Red Raiders compiled a 5–3 record and outscored opponents by a total of 125 to 76. James Garvey was the team captain. The team played its home games at Colgate Athletic Field in Hamilton, New York.

Schedule

References

Colgate
Colgate Raiders football seasons
Colgate Red Raiders football